Jack Burton may refer to:

 Jack Burton (character), lead character in the film Big Trouble in Little China
 Jack Burton (cricketer) (1923–2001), Australian cricketer
 Jack Burton (equestrian) (born 1919), American Olympic equestrian

See also 
 John Burton (disambiguation)